Presidents of the Prussian House of Deputies

Sources 
Pöls, Werner: Grabow, Wilhelm in Neue Deutsche Biographie
Nordisk Familjebok
Herzfeld, Hans: Bennigsen, Karl Wilhelm Rudolf von in Neue Deutsche Biographie
Biographische Handbuch für den Preußische Abgeordnetenhaus 1867-1918 (Edited by Bernhard Mann, assisted by Martin Doerry, Cornelia Rauh and Thomas Kühne), Düsseldorf 1988, 

Political history of Germany
Lists of legislative speakers in Germany